There are two articles for Canadian band The Poppy Family:

Which Way You Goin' Billy? (album)
"Which Way You Goin' Billy? (song)"

The Poppy Family albums
The Poppy Family songs